Chestfield and Swalecliffe railway station is on the  branch of the Chatham Main Line in England, serving the villages of Chestfield, Swalecliffe and the Eastern region of the town of Whitstable, Kent.

The station and all trains that serve the station are operated by Southeastern.

It was originally opened as "Swalecliffe Halt" on 6 July 1930 by Southern Railway. It was later renamed "Chestfield & Swalecliffe Halt", shortened to "Chestfield" in 1987 and reverted to "Chestfield and Swalecliffe" in 1989. Although the railway station itself actually lies in the village of Swalecliffe, nearby Chestfield is substantially the bigger village.

There are waiting shelters and an Up side booking office, which is open for a few hours each morning; the platforms are built of rails and sleepers. The "down" ticket office was burnt down by vandals in 1989.

Services 

All services at Chestfield & Swalecliffe are operated by Southeastern  using  and  EMUs.

The typical off-peak service in trains per hour is:

 1 tph to  
 1 tph to 

The station is also served by a small number of High Speed services to London St Pancras International.

References

External links 

City of Canterbury
Railway stations in Kent
DfT Category E stations
Former Southern Railway (UK) stations
Railway stations in Great Britain opened in 1930
Railway stations served by Southeastern